Måns Herngren (born 20 April 1965) is a Swedish actor and noted director. Almost all of his films are done together with his friend Hannes Holm. He is the older brother to actor and comedian Felix Herngren.

Måns Herngren was married to Lena Philipsson from 1993 to 2002. He was married to former high jumper Kajsa Bergqvist, but their divorce was announced early 2011.

Selected filmography 
1990: S*M*A*S*H (Director)
1995: One in a Million (En på miljonen) (Director)
1997: Adam & Eva (Director)
1998: Snow (Director)
2000: Det blir aldrig som man tänkt sig (Things Never End Up The Way You've Planned) (Director)
2001: En fot i graven (TV mini-series director)
2002: Klassfesten (The Class Reunion) (Director)
2006: Varannan vecka (Every Other Week) (Actor and director)
2008: Allt flyter (The Swimsuit Issue) (Director)
2016: The 101-Year-Old Man Who Skipped Out on the Bill and Disappeared (Co-director)

References

External links

Swedish male actors
Living people
1965 births
Swedish television directors